The Mother Hips discography is a list of official studio albums, live albums, EPs, singles, compilations, videos and other recordings released by the band the Mother Hips. The Mother Hips are a rock band based in the San Francisco Bay Area, consisting of members Tim Bluhm, Greg Loiacono, John Hofer, and Brian Rashap. Past members included Isaac Parsons, Mike Wofchuck, Paul Hoaglin and Scott Thunes.

Studio albums

Live albums

EPs

Singles

Videography

Compilations

External links
Mother Hips official discography
Mother Hips at discogs

Mother Hips, The
Rock music group discographies